Andrew Bell  (27 March 1753 – 27 January 1832) was a Scottish Episcopalian priest and educationalist who pioneered the Madras System of Education (also known as "mutual instruction" or the "monitorial system") in schools and was the founder of Madras College, a secondary school in St Andrews.

Life and work

Andrew Bell was born at St. Andrews, in Scotland on 27 March 1753 and attended St. Andrews University where he did well in mathematics and natural philosophy, graduating in 1774.

In 1774 he sailed to Virginia as a private tutor and remained there until 1781 when he left to avoid involvement in the war of independence. He returned to Scotland, surviving a shipwreck on the way, and officiated at the Episcopal Chapel in Leith. He was ordained Deacon in 1784 and Priest in the Church of England in 1785.

In February 1787 he went out to India and went ashore at Madras, where he stayed for 10 years. He became chaplain to a number of British regiments and gave a course of lectures. In 1789 he was appointed superintendent of an orphan asylum for the illegitimate and orphaned sons of officers. He claimed to see some Malabar children teaching others the alphabet by drawing in sand and decided to develop a similar method, putting bright children in charge of those who were less bright. He was opposed to corporal punishment and used a system of rewards.

In Bell's adaption of the Madras, or monitorial system as it later came to be known, a schoolmaster would teach a small group of brighter or older pupils basic lessons, and each of them would then relate the lesson to another group of children.

He was a careful man and accumulated considerable wealth. In August 1796 he left India because of his health and published an account of his system, which started to be introduced into a few English schools from 1798/99, and he devoted himself to spreading and developing the system. He served as a priest in Edinburgh for a short time and married Agnes, daughter of a Dr George Barclay in December 1801. He was then appointed Rector of St Mary's Church, Swanage in Dorset and established a school there to teach straw-plaiting to girls and also using his system to teach infants. He and his wife adopted the new discovery of vaccination for smallpox and personally successfully vaccinated very many people in the district. However his marriage was unsuccessful and a decree of judicial separation was granted in 1806.

Another educationist, Joseph Lancaster, was promoting a similar but not identical system and their differences developed into a major and continuing dispute. Unlike Bell's schools, those established by Lancaster were not committed to the Church of England.

Bell received powerful support from the Church and his system was adopted in army schools and the Clergy Orphan School. A society was founded in November 1811 which set up schools using Bell's system. This was the National Society for the Education of the Poor in the Principles of the Christian Church. By the time of his death twelve thousand schools had been established in Great Britain and the colonies. The system was also used by the Church Missionary Society and other institutions.

Bell was a fanatical enthusiast for his system and an intolerant man. He was difficult to deal with and hard to work under. Nevertheless, he always got on well with children.

Death

He retired to Lindsay Cottage in Cheltenham, a wealthy man, at the age of 75 and died at home, aged 78, on 27 January 1832. He was buried in Westminster Abbey with a monument designed and carved by William Behnes. He left substantial sums of money for educational purposes but with what many considered unreasonable conditions attached.

His system did not survive for long after his death. It needed close and enthusiastic supervision and small classes and was only really useful when funds were sparse and teachers in very short supply.

See also
Bell-Lancaster method
Learning by teaching (LdL)
Madras College, St Andrews

Notes

References
Bell, Andrew: An analysis of the experiment in education, made at Egmore, near Madras (London, 1807: Available on Google Books)
Bell, Andrew: An Experiment in Education Made At The Male Asylum of Madras.  Suggesting A System By Which A School or Family May Teach Itself Under the Superintendance Of The Master Or Parent. By The Rev. Dr.Andrew Bell. 1797- Primary Source Edition [Available on Amazon.com]
Bell, Andrew: Mutual Tuition and Moral Discipline: Or, Manual of Instructions from Conducting Schools Through the Agency of the Scholars Themselves: For the Use of Schools and Families. with an Introductory Essay On the Object and Importance of the Madras Sysetem of Education. 1823 Primary Source Edition [Available on Amazon.com]

Further reading
 John Miller Dow Meiklejohn (1881), An Old Educational Reformer: Dr. Andrew Bell

External links
 Significant Scots: Andrew Bell
 Spartacus International: Andrew Bell
 Madras College
 Texts by Andrew Bell at archive.org

1753 births
1832 deaths
18th-century Scottish Episcopalian priests
19th-century Scottish Episcopalian priests
People from St Andrews
Alumni of the University of St Andrews
People educated at Madras College
Fellows of the Royal Society of Edinburgh
Burials at Westminster Abbey
Scottish people of the British Empire
Fellows of the Royal Asiatic Society
Scottish orientalists
Scottish educational theorists
British people in colonial India